Brendan Mitchell Smith (born 24 September 1985) is an English former first-class cricketer.

Smith was born at Basildon in September 1985. He later studied at Anglia Ruskin University, where he played first-class cricket for Cambridge UCCE in 2007–08, making five appearances. Playing as a left-arm fast-medium bowler, he took 7 wickets in his five matches at an average of 69.42, with best figures of 4 for 102.

Notes and references

External links

1985 births
Living people
Sportspeople from Basildon
Alumni of Anglia Ruskin University
English cricketers
Cambridge MCCU cricketers